Ilham is a unisex name that derives from the Arabic word for inspiration. It is usually a given name, rarely used as a surname. Notable people with the name include:

Given name:
 Ilham Aliyev (born 1961), President of Azerbaijan since 2003
 Ilham al-Madfai (born c. 1942), Iraqi guitarist, singer and composer
 Ilham Chahine (born 1961), Egyptian actress
 Ilham Ghali of Kazan (c. 1449 – c. 1490), khan of Kazan Khanate
 Ilham Hussain (born 1955), wife of Dr. Mohammed Waheed Hassan
 Ilham Jaya Kesuma, Indonesian footballer
 Ilham Moussaïd, French politician
 Ilham Tohti (born 1969), Uyghur economist serving a life sentence in China, on separatism-related charges
 Ilham Yadullayev (born 1975), Azerbaijani footballer
 Ilham Zakiyev (born 1980), Azerbaijani judo practitioner

Surname:
 Muhammad Ilham (born 1981), Indonesian footballer